Saint Jean d'Acre ('Saint John of Acre') or the Italian equivalent San Giovanni d'Acri (and Acone) may refer to :

 the city Acre, Israel, notably during the crusader Latin Kingdom of Jerusalem (later shifting its capital to Acre)
 a former Latin Catholic Diocese of Acre with see there, later a titular see